The 1988 World Junior Figure Skating Championships were held on 8–12 December 1987 in Brisbane, Australia. The event was sanctioned by the International Skating Union and open to ISU member nations. Medals were awarded in the disciplines of men's singles, ladies' singles, pair skating, and ice dancing.

Results

Men

Ladies

Pairs

Ice dancing

References

World Junior Figure Skating Championships
1987 in figure skating
1988 in figure skating
International figure skating competitions hosted by Australia
Sports competitions in Brisbane